Sly Cooper and the Thievius Raccoonus (known as Sly Raccoon in PAL territories) is a 2002 stealth platform video game developed by Sucker Punch Productions and published by Sony Computer Entertainment for the PlayStation 2. It is the first installment of the Sly Cooper series. The game was followed by three sequels, Sly 2: Band of Thieves, Sly 3: Honor Among Thieves and Sly Cooper: Thieves in Time. On November 9, 2010, Sly Cooper and the Thievius Raccoonus, as well as its first two sequels, were released together as The Sly Collection, a remastered port of all three games on a single Blu-ray as a Classics HD title for the PlayStation 3.

The game focuses on master thief Sly Cooper and his gang, Bentley the Turtle and Murray the Hippo, as they seek out the Fiendish Five to recover his family's "Thievius Raccoonus," a book with the accumulation of all of Sly's ancestors' thieving moves. The game was praised for using a variation on cel-shading rendering, which is used to create a film noir feel, while still rendered as a hand-drawn animated movie, though criticized for being too short.

Gameplay
Sly Cooper is a third person platforming video game which incorporates stealth elements; as noted by an Official U.S. PlayStation Magazine retrospective, the game "tries to mix one-hit-kill arcade action with Splinter Cell sneaking". The player controls Sly Cooper, the title character, as he moves between each uniquely themed lair of the Fiendish Five and the sub-sections of those lairs, avoiding security systems and the watchful eyes of enemies. While Sly is equipped with a cane to attack his foes, he can be defeated with a single hit, and so the player is urged to use stealth maneuvers and the environment to evade or silently neutralize potential threats.

To assist in these stealth moves, the environment contains special areas colored with blue sparkles of light, identified in the game as Sly's "thief senses." The player can trigger context-sensitive actions in these areas, such as shimmying along a narrow ledge or wall, landing on a pointed object such as an antenna or streetlight, climbing along the length of a narrow pole or pipe or using the cane to grapple onto something. The player must avoid detection by security systems and enemies, otherwise, an alarm will sound and the player will either have to destroy the alarm, avoid or defeat foes alerted by the alarm or hide for several seconds until the alarm resets. The game uses a dynamic music system that changes depending on the state of alarm in the area: the music will increase in volume and pacing when Sly attacks or is detected, and then will quiet down as the disturbance goes away.

Each sub-section of a lair contains a number of clue bottles that, when collected, allow Sly to access a safe in the level that contains a page from the Thievius Raccoonus. These pages grant Sly new moves to aid in movement, stealth, or combat, such as creating a decoy or dropping an explosive hat. Defeating each of the bosses also gives Sly moves, and these abilities are typically necessary to pass later levels. Coins are scattered about the levels and are also generated by defeating enemies or destroying objects. For every 100 coins collected, Sly gains a lucky horseshoe that is the color blue and when you have two horseshoes, it turns to gold. It will allow him to take extra hits, or if he currently has one, an extra life. If Sly collapses and loses a life, the current sub-level will be restarted or at a special "repeater" that acts as a checkpoint; if the player loses all of Sly's lives, they must restart that bosses' lair from the beginning. Besides the regular gameplay, there are mini-games that include driving levels (based on Murray), shooting levels to protect Murray as he ascends certain levels, and a cyber-tank game representing a hacking attempt by Bentley. One notable boss battle includes a rhythm-based sequence similar to Dance Dance Revolution.

Levels can be returned to at any time to gain additional coins or to seek out special moves. When a level is completed, all of the clue bottles are collected and the secret move is found, the player can then attempt a "Master Sprint", a timed sprint through the level to try to beat a set time. The player can unlock additional artistic content by completing all the levels in this fashion. For each level that has the "Master Sprint" completed, a developers commentary for that level is unlocked.

Plot

Sly Cooper comes from a long line of master thieves (the Cooper Clan) who only steal from other criminals, thus making them vigilantes. The Cooper family's heirloom, an ancient book named The Thievius Raccoonus, records all the secret moves and techniques of every Cooper clan member. On his 8th birthday, Sly was supposed to inherit the book and learn all his family's ancient secrets, which was supposed to help him become a master thief. However, a group of thugs called "The Fiendish Five" (led by Clockwerk, the arch-nemesis of the family clan) attacked the Cooper household, killed Sly's parents, and stole all the pages from the Thievius Raccoonus. After that, the ruthless gang goes their separate ways to commit dastardly crimes worldwide. Sly is sent to an orphanage where he meets and forms a gang with two boys who become his lifelong best friends: Bentley, a turtle technician, inventor, and talented mathematical hacker with encyclopedic knowledge who plays the role of the brains of the gang, and Murray, a huge hippopotamus with a ginormous appetite who plays the role as the brawns and the getaway driver of the gang. The three leave the orphanage together at age 16 to start their lives becoming international vigilante criminals, naming themselves "The Cooper Gang." Sly swears one day to avenge his family and track down the Fiendish Five and steal back the Thievius Raccoonus. 2 years later, the Cooper Gang heads to Paris, France, to infiltrate Interpol headquarters to find the secret police file which stores details and information about the Fiendish Five. During the heist, they are ambushed by Inspector Carmelita Fox (towards whom Sly develops a romantic attraction), an Interpol police officer who is after the Cooper Gang. The gang manages to steal the police file and successfully escapes from her and the rest of the cops. With the secret police file finally in their hands, the Cooper Gang manages to track down the Fiendish Five.

Their first target is Sir Raleigh, a greedy aristocratic bullfrog who uses his mechanical skills to prey on sunken ships and steal buried treasures throughout the islands of Wales. After bringing down Raleigh and leaving him to be arrested by Interpol, the gang then heads to Mesa City, Utah, where Raleigh's old friend Muggshot, a muscular bulldog, has taken over the city center for his personal gambling empire and street crimes. Once Muggshot and his gangsters are dealt with, the gang heads to their third target in the Hatian jungle; Mz. Ruby, a voodoo priestess alligator, who plans to create an army of ghosts to terrorize those who rejected her as a child. The fourth target, the mysterious Panda King, resides in the Kunlun Mountains of China, where he terrorizes nearby villages by burying them in avalanches triggered by his fireworks. With four of the five members of the Fiendish Five dealt with and locked up by the police, Sly analyzes the collected pages of the Thievius Raccoonus and determines that the final target is Clockwerk, the leader of the Fiendish Five who killed Sly's parents and stole the Thievius Raccoonus. The gang soon discovers that Clockwerk has always stalked the Cooper Clan since its earliest days. Bentley traces the metal used in some of the Fiendish Five's vehicles to a remote volcano in Russia, where the gang heads next.

Using special upgrades to the team van, the gang breaches Clockwerk's lair only to discover that Carmelita has been captured. Sly tries to save her but gets gassed by one of Clockwerk's traps. Bentley manages to save him by hacking into Clockwerk's security algorithm and shutting down the gas, saving Sly, and allowing him to rescue Carmelita and break her free from the dome cell she was trapped in. Despite their professional differences and the fact they are on opposing sides of the law, Sly and Carmelita agree to team up to stop Clockwerk and end his dastardly deeds. Sly manages to get past Clockwerk's death ray base and destroys it by trapping it to sink and finds a jetpack and uses it, allowing him to confront Clockwerk once and for all. Sly and Clockwerk engage in aerial combat, with Clockwerk revealing that he has always been jealous of the Coopers and that he turned himself into an immortal machine fueled by his jealousy and hatred toward the clan. Clockwerk recruited the Fiendish Five for the sole purpose of destroying the Cooper family's legacy. Clockwerk also revealed that the reason why he and the Fiendish Five left Sly alive after they killed his parents was to prove that since the Thievius Raccoonus was stolen, Sly would be useless and weak without it, as Clockwerk wanted to prove that the Cooper Line was nothing without their family heirloom. Sly replies that the Thievius Raccoonus doesn't create great thieves and that it only takes great thieves to create the Thievius Raccoonus and proceeds to destroy Clockwerk's body and head. After the battle is over and Clockwerk is defeated, Carmelita moves to arrest Sly now that their temporary truce is done with but agrees to give him a ten-second head start. Sly kisses her at the last second while also handcuffing her to a rail, running off with his gang in celebration as Carmelita _ initially touched by the kiss - angrily swears to hunt him down. Sly, Bentley, and Murray make it back to their hideout and manage to reassemble and restore the Thievius Raccoonus with all the complete pages they recovered, with Sly finally completing his life-long goal to avenge his family line and steal back his birthright. The gang remains together and pulls off new heists with the now-recovered Thievius Raccoonus.

After the credits, one of Clockwerk's eyes flashes open, indicating that he is still alive.

Development
Sly Cooper and the Thievius Raccoonus was developed by Sucker Punch Productions, being the 2nd game created by them following Rocket: Robot on Wheels for the Nintendo 64.

Graphics and visual design
Brian Flemming of Sucker Punch called the rendering style as "Toon-shading", comparing the detailed backgrounds with cel-shading foregrounds to that of animated movies. An interview with the Sucker Punch development team identified that they took this route because "We wanted Sly and his world to look illustrated, but one step away from a flattened graphic style." To prevent slowdowns with framerates, the team "had at least one engineer working on nothing but performance for the entire development of Sly." The game art team "collected hundreds of photos and drawings of areas that looked like the worlds [they] wanted to create" to generate the backgrounds. The characters themselves underwent up to "six or eight major revisions" before the designs were finalized.

Soundtrack
The music was inspired by the artwork from the game; Ashif Hakik, composer of the game's music, stated that "Stylistic influences came from a combination of instrument choices and musical character defined and inspired by the locales in the game, and similar composer works like Yoko Kanno and her work on Cowboy Bebop, Henry Mancini, and Carl Stalling." He continued to note that "the interactive music engine we used made us consider the gameplay for each specific level a sort of starting point that would influence the way the music would be written."

Reception

Sales of Sly Cooper were initially poor, overshadowed by two other PlayStation 2 platformers published around 2002, Ratchet & Clank and Jak and Daxter: The Precursor Legacy. It was a nominee for GameSpots 2002 "Best Game No One Played on PlayStation 2" award. This, however, did not prevent the game from achieving at least 400,000 in sales a year since release to allow it to be included in Sony's "Greatest Hits" line, republishing it in 2003 and at a lower price. By July 2006, Sly Cooper and the Thievius Raccoonus had sold 800,000 copies and earned $21 million in the United States. Next Generation ranked it as the 78th highest-selling game launched for the PlayStation 2, Xbox or GameCube between January 2000 and July 2006 in that country. Combined sales of the Sly Cooper series reached 2.2 million units in the United States by July 2006.

Sly Cooper and the Thievius Raccoonus was well received by the video game media. Most reviewers praised the unique look of the game. GameSpot noted that "The game has a fantastic sense of style to its design that is reflected in everything from the animation to the unique use of the peaking fad, cel-shaded polygons." Many reviews also appreciated the ease of learning the controls and gameplay; IGN stated that "Sly is incredibly responsive, and though his size seems a little large at times due to his long arms and legs and the cane he carries, skillfully jumping and hitting enemies with precision is a quick study." Several reviewers appreciated the fluidity of the game between actual play, cutscenes, and other features. The game was also praised for being a game that was accessible to both adults and children.

A common detraction of the game was its length; as commented by GameSpot's review, "The main problem is that just as you're getting into a groove and really enjoying the variety seen throughout the different levels, the game ends." The length was defended by Sucker Punch's developers; Brian Flemming noted that there was additional content to be unlocked at several levels, including "for each [Master Sprint] you complete, you get bonus commentary from the designers, artists and programmers here at Sucker Punch, something that people have reacted to really positively." The game was also cited as being too easy, with GameSpot stating that "The game's relative ease combined with a very short length prevents Sly Cooper from becoming the next big platformer. But it's great while it lasts." However, Official U.S. PlayStation Magazine noted that in regards to the difficulty "There's a pleasant old-school feel to Thievius Raccoonus; the enemies are merciless but a bit stupid, and the platforming challenges come on strong and ramp up steadily in difficulty as the levels go by." Reviewers also noted some framerate slowdowns in latter levels of the game, as well as some camera control issues.

GameSpy considered Sly Cooper to be the 5th most underrated game of all time in a 2003 listing. The game has since yielded three sequels, Sly 2: Band of Thieves (2004), Sly 3: Honor Among Thieves (2005) and Sly Cooper: Thieves in Time (2013). Sly Cooper won "Best New Character" and nominated for "Excellence in Visual Arts" at the 2003 Game Developer's Conference for 2002. Furthermore, the character of Sly Cooper has also been come to be considered as a mascot for the PlayStation systems, alongside both Ratchet & Clank and Jak & Daxter. This has further led to collaboration between the development teams for all three series, Sucker Punch, Insomniac Games, and Naughty Dog, leading to subtle inclusion of some elements of Sly Cooper within the other titles. For example, a brief gameplay clip of Sly Cooper plays among several for Ratchet & Clank 1&2, Jak and Daxter, and Jak II during the start menu for Ratchet & Clank: Going Commando.

References

External links

Official website

2002 video games
3D platform games
Stealth video games
PlayStation 2 games
PlayStation 2-only games
Single-player video games
Interactive Achievement Award winners
Sly Cooper
Video games about raccoons
Video games with commentaries
Video games with cel-shaded animation
Video games scored by Ashif Hakik
Video games set in Utah
Video games set in China
Video games set in Haiti
Video games set in Paris
Video games set in Wales
Video games set in Russia
Video games developed in the United States